Horacio Zeballos won last year's edition, but decided not to participate this year.
Máximo González won the title, by defeating top seed Pablo Cuevas 6–4, 6–3 in the final.

Seeds

Draw

Finals

Top half

Bottom half

References
 Main Draw
 Qualifying Draw

Copa Petrobras Buenos Aires - Singles
Copa Petrobras Buenos Aires